USS Narcissus (WAGL-238) was built for the United States Coast Guard by Marine Iron and Shipbuilding Corporation, Duluth, Minnesota, in 1939. Designed as a navigational aid tender, she was assigned to Wilmington, North Carolina. In 1940 she transferred to Portsmouth, Virginia.

Executive Order 8929 of 1 November 1941 transferred the Coast Guard to the US Navy. Through the war years Narcissus continued to serve as a large inland buoy tender, operating out of Portsmouth. When the Coast Guard returned to the Treasury Department on 1 January 1946, the tender remained in an active status. Through 1970 she has continued her buoytending duties from her permanent station at Portsmouth.

References
 US Coast Guard site

Tenders of the United States Navy
1939 ships